The Buenos Aires Convention (Third Pan-American Convention) is an international copyright treaty signed in Buenos Aires, Argentina, on 11 August 1910, providing mutual recognition of copyrights where the work carries a notice containing a statement of reservation of rights (Art. 3). This was commonly done with the phrase "All rights reserved" next to the copyright notice. This implementation varied as US law only required the author and year of publishing. Copyright protection under the convention is granted for the shorter of the terms of the protecting country and the source country of the work ("rule of the shorter term", Arts. 6, 7). The rather vague nature of the requirement for a statement of reservation led to the development of longer and more legalistic wordings, which have persisted despite the developments in international copyright law.

The convention is specifically retained by the Universal Copyright Convention (UCC) of 6 September 1952 (Art. 18 Geneva Act), with the most recent formulation taking precedence in case of conflict. As the Buenos Aires Convention was not modified, the presence of a simple copyright notice was sufficient to ensure mutual recognition of copyright between countries which became parties to the UCC (which only Honduras never did).

The Buenos Aires Convention became a "special agreement" in the terms of Article 20 of the Berne Convention. It remains in force, notably for determining the source country of a work and hence the term of protection which is applicable in countries which apply the "rule of the shorter term": when a work is simultaneously published in a Convention State and a non-Convention State, the Convention State will be taken to be the source country regardless of the term of protection in the non-Convention State.

Sources: U.S. Copyright Office, UNESCO, WIPO

References
 Geneva Act of the Universal Copyright Convention, done at Geneva, 1952-09-06.
 Berne Convention for the Protection of Literary and Artistic Works  (Paris Act), as amended on 1979-09-28.
 The United States has never applied the rule of the shorter term: all copyright works are protected for the normal U.S. term of copyright.
 The United States deposited its Instruments of Ratification with the Government of Argentina on 1911-05-01, and hence the treaty came into force with respect to the other parties three months after that date (Art. 16). The treaty was not proclaimed in the United States until 1914-07-13.
 "International Copyright Relations of the United States", U.S. Copyright Office Circular No. 38a, August 2003.
 Parties to the Geneva Act of the Universal Copyright Convention as of 2000-01-01: the dates given in the document are dates of ratification, not dates of coming into force. The Geneva Act came into force on 1955-09-16 for the first twelve to have ratified (which included four non-members of the Berne Union as required by Art. 9.1), or three months after ratification for other countries.
 Parties to the Berne Convention for the Protection of Literary and Artistic Works as of 2006-05-30.

External links 

Text of the Convention

Intellectual property treaties
History of Buenos Aires
Copyright treaties
Treaties concluded in 1910
Treaties entered into force in 1914
Treaties of Argentina
Treaties of Bolivia
Treaties of the First Brazilian Republic
Treaties of Chile
Treaties of Colombia
Treaties of Costa Rica
Treaties of the Dominican Republic
Treaties of Ecuador
Treaties of Haiti
Treaties of Guatemala
Treaties of Honduras
Treaties of Nicaragua
Treaties of Mexico
Treaties of Panama
Treaties of Paraguay
Treaties of Peru
Treaties of the United States
Treaties of Uruguay
1910 in Argentina
1910s in Buenos Aires